LiveAndWell.com is a 1999 limited edition live album by David Bowie. It was not available commercially and could only be acquired by being subscribed to BowieNet at the time. The album is made up of recordings from the 1997 Earthling Tour, featuring songs from the albums 1. Outside (1995) and Earthling (1997)

In late 2020, it was announced that the album would be released publicly for the first time on 15 January 2021.

Background
Following the successful Earthling Tour, Bowie, Reeves Gabrels and Mark Plati mixed a live album, intending it for a commercial release. However, Virgin, Bowie's label at the time, scrapped the release when it was submitted to them in late 1998. During the mixing of this live album, Bowie and the band also recorded "Fun" and a cover of Bob Dylan's "Tryin' to Get to Heaven". Some of these live tracks, as well as a remix of the song "Fun", were then released to subscribers of BowieNet as downloads before being released as the album LiveAndWell.com. The cover of "Tryin' to Get to Heaven" was played once on a Spanish radio station and was unavailable for over 20 years until its release in early 2021. "Fun" remained unreleased for over 20 years until it was included on Is It Any Wonder? (EP) (2020).

The track listing for the release contains an error according to Bowie biographer Nicholas Pegg: "The Hearts Filthy Lesson", while being listed as being recorded in 1997's Phoenix Festival, is in fact from the Phoenix Festival the year prior.

Releases
A second release of the CD in 2000 came with a bonus disc made up of four rare remixes, which has not been re-released since. The album was digitally reissued on 15 May 2020 without this second CD of songs, although the "Fun" remix was released as a separate digital download on its own. The digital re-issue included two tracks recorded from the Earthling Tour when Bowie's band performed under the pseudonym "Tao Jones Index".

In January 2021, LiveAndWell.com was re-released on vinyl and CD, again without the 2nd CD of remixes as part of the 6-album set Brilliant Live Adventures.

Reviews
Pegg calls the album a "beautifully mixed and hugely impressive memento of Bowie's mid-1990s live experience".

Track listing

Personnel
 David Bowie – vocals, guitar, saxophone
 Reeves Gabrels – guitar, vocals
 Gail Ann Dorsey – bass, vocals, keyboards
 Zack Alford – drums
 Mike Garson – keyboards, synthesizer, piano
 Live show sound engineers;
  Michael Prowda – monitors
  Steve Guest – FOH

References

David Bowie live albums
1999 live albums
1999 remix albums
Albums recorded at Radio City Music Hall
Albums produced by Reeves Gabrels
Albums produced by Mark Plati